Saed Salifu (born 17 April 1997) is a Ghanaian professional footballer who plays as a goalkeeper for Ghanaian Premier League side Accra Great Olympics.

Career

Early career 
Born in Anum- Asikuma, Salifu started his career with Asikuma Black Scorpions now rechristened FC Royal Crown in Asikuma. He later moved to lower-tier side Krystal Palace Academy in Akosombo who play in the Ghana Division One League. In 2016, he played against his future club, International Allies in a round of 32 Ghanaian FA Cup match, he put up an impressive display even though his club lost by 1–0 and was signed by Inter Allies in the next transfer period in June 2016.

International Allies 
In June 2016, Salifu was signed by Accra-based club International Allies during the second transfer period of the 2016 Ghanaian Premier League season. He made his debut on 29 June 2016 in a 2–0 loss to Berekum Chelsea, coming on in the 65th minute for injured goalkeeper Kwame Osei. On 25 May 2017, he made his full debut in a 1–0 win against West African Football Academy (WAFA) in the absence of main goalkeeper Kwame Baah, in the process keeping his first clean sheet in the Ghana Premier League. He was named as the club's player of the week for that performance. He went on to make 8 league matches within the season as he served as the second goalkeeper behind Kwame Baah. On 23 May 2018, he played the 90 minutes and was adjudged the man of the match in a match against Wa All, he kept a clean sheet to help them to a 1–0 win with the goal from Michel Otou. In the 2018 Ghanaian Premier League, he continued to compete with Baah but this time he played 1 match more than him, he played 9 league as against his 8 league matches before the league was abandoned due to the dissolution of the GFA in June 2018, as a result of the Anas Number 12 Expose. With Baah joining Kumasi Asante Kotoko, he was left alone as the main goalkeeper for the side. He played in 10 out of 14 league match within the 2019 GFA Committee Special Competition season. He left the club at the end of his contract in late 2019.

Great Olympics 
In October 2020, Salifu along with his colleague the former Inter Allies Captain, Michel Otou moved to join Teshie-based team Accra Great Olympics and began training with the team ahead of the 2020–21 Ghana Premier League. They were both named in the club's squad list for the season.  On 30 January 2021 during the Ga Mashie Derby, he played the full 90 minutes and kept a clean sheet in a historic 2–0 win over rivals Accra Hears of Oak, the first derby win for Olympics since 2004. He was adjudged the man of the match after his impressive display by parring off shots from Hearts of Oak and keeping a clean sheet. Saed established himself as the first-choice goalkeeper for the club immediately after joining from Inter Allies in 2020.

References

External links 

 

Living people
1997 births
Association football goalkeepers
Ghanaian footballers
International Allies F.C. players
Ghana Premier League players
Accra Great Olympics F.C. players